Maite Star Kelly (born 4 December 1979) is a German-born Irish singer and actress. The second youngest child of The Kelly Family, she is the only one born in Germany. When she was younger, Kelly worked singing with her family. Later she started a solo career.

Biography

Kelly was born in West Berlin to Daniel and Barbara Kelly. She is one of The Kelly Family, a music group made up of members of the extended Kelly family. Their style of music is folk, pop and pop rock. Her siblings first appeared as Kelly Kids in 1974 and they traveled through the USA and Europe under the name The Kelly Family from 1978 and performed numerous free concerts in public places and pedestrian zones as street musicians. Though she was born in Germany, Kelly was educated in the USA. However she lives in Cologne. She was married to model Florent Michel Raimond with whom she had three children. Her first solo album was released in 2007. She went on to take part in the German version of the musical Hairspray and appear in Dancing with the stars. Kelly wrote the children's book, Die kleine Hummel Bommel which was published in 2015. In 2012 she was awarded the Order of Merit of the State of North Rhine-Westphalia for "her role model as an artist and socially committed citizen" and in 2019 she was given an award by SWR4.

Discography

Studio albums

References

1979 births
German people of Irish descent
Irish women singers
Irish musical theatre actresses
Members of the Order of Merit of North Rhine-Westphalia
Singers from Berlin
Living people